Cueifong Lake is a lake in Taipingshan National Forest Recreation Area, Nan'ao Township, Yilan County, Taiwan.

Geography
The lake is the largest alpine lake in Taiwan, located at an altitude of 1,900 meters. The lake covers an area of 20 hectares. Its water is clear and unpolluted. During rainy season, the area of the lake can reach up to 25 hectares.

Architecture
The lake features walking trails with a total length of 3.95 km at an elevation of 1,900–2,000 meters. Along the trail, there is a Ching-feng exhibition warehouse which was renovated from a former train fuel storage building.

See also
 Geography of Taiwan

References

Lakes of Yilan County, Taiwan